Castaffa Creek is a stream in the U.S. state of Mississippi. It is a tributary to Shubuta Creek.

Castaffa is a name derived from the Choctaw language. Variant names are "Castaffy Creek" and "Chaslaffa Creek".

References

Rivers of Mississippi
Rivers of Clarke County, Mississippi
Rivers of Jasper County, Mississippi
Mississippi placenames of Native American origin